The 2014 WGC-Bridgestone Invitational was a professional golf tournament held July 31 – August 3 on the South Course of Firestone Country Club in Akron, Ohio. It was the 16th WGC-Bridgestone Invitational tournament, and the third of the World Golf Championships events in 2014. Rory McIlroy won the tournament.

Venue

Course layout
The South Course was designed by Bert Way and redesigned by Robert Trent Jones in 1960.

Field
The field consists of players drawn primarily from the Official World Golf Ranking and the winners of the world-wide tournaments with the strongest fields.

1. Playing members of the 2013 United States and International Presidents Cup teams.

Keegan Bradley (2,3), Ángel Cabrera (4), Jason Day (2,3), Brendon de Jonge, Graham DeLaet (2,3), Jason Dufner (2,3,4), Ernie Els, Branden Grace, Bill Haas (2,3), Zach Johnson (2,3,4), Matt Kuchar (2,3,4), Marc Leishman, Hunter Mahan (2,3), Hideki Matsuyama (2,3), Phil Mickelson (2,3), Louis Oosthuizen (4), Charl Schwartzel (2,3), Adam Scott (2,3,4,5), Webb Simpson (2,3,4), Brandt Snedeker (2,3), Jordan Spieth (2,3), Richard Sterne, Steve Stricker (2,3), Tiger Woods (2,3)

2. The top 50 players from the Official World Golf Ranking as of July 21, 2014.

Thomas Bjørn (3,4), Jonas Blixt (3), Luke Donald (3,4), Jamie Donaldson (3), Victor Dubuisson (3,4), Harris English (3), Matt Every (3,4), Rickie Fowler (3), Jim Furyk (3), Stephen Gallacher (3,4), Sergio García (3,4,5), Mikko Ilonen (3,4), Thongchai Jaidee (3,4), Miguel Ángel Jiménez (3,4), Martin Kaymer (3,4), Chris Kirk (3,4), Joost Luiten (3), Graeme McDowell (3,4), Rory McIlroy (3,4), Francesco Molinari (3), Ryan Moore (3,4), Kevin Na (3), Ian Poulter (3), Patrick Reed (3,4), Justin Rose (3,4), Henrik Stenson (3,4), Kevin Streelman (3,4), Brendon Todd (3,4), Jimmy Walker (3,4), Bubba Watson (3,4), Lee Westwood (3,4), Gary Woodland (3)

Dustin Johnson (3,4) withdrew prior to the tournament

3. The top 50 players from the Official World Golf Ranking as of July 28, 2014.

4. Tournament winners, whose victories are considered official, of tournaments from the Federation Tours since the prior season's Bridgestone Invitational with an Official World Golf Ranking Strength of Field Rating of 115 points or more.

Steven Bowditch, Tim Clark, Ben Crane, Gonzalo Fernández-Castaño, Brian Harman, Russell Henley, J. B. Holmes, David Howell, Matt Jones, Pablo Larrazábal, Alexander Lévy, David Lynn, Noh Seung-yul, John Senden, Kevin Stadler, Scott Stallings, Fabrizio Zanotti

5. The winner of selected tournaments from each of the following tours:
Asian Tour: Thailand Golf Championship (2013) – Sergio García (already qualified under categories 2 and 4)
PGA Tour of Australasia: Australian PGA Championship (2013) – Adam Scott (already qualified under categories 1, 2 and 4)
Japan Golf Tour: Bridgestone Open (2013) – Daisuke Maruyama
Japan Golf Tour: Japan Golf Tour Championship – Yoshitaka Takeya
Sunshine Tour: Dimension Data Pro-Am – Estanislao Goya

Nine players were appearing in their first WGC event: Steven Bowditch,  Matt Every, Estanislao Goya, Brian Harman, Matt Jones, Alexander Lévy, Yoshitaka Takeya, Brendon Todd and Fabrizio Zanotti.

Nationalities in the field

Past champions in the field 

Source:

Round summaries

First round
Thursday, July 31, 2014

Source:

Second round
Friday, August 1, 2014

Sergio García birdied his last seven holes, tying the course record of 61 (−9), which included a new course record of 27 (−8) on the back nine.

Source:

Third round
Saturday, August 2, 2014

With threatening weather in the forecast, the field went off early in the morning from split tees in threesomes. A weather delay in the early afternoon affected the final several groups, but all rounds were finished.

Source:

Final round
Sunday, August 3, 2014

The field went off the first tee in conventional pairs on Sunday, but a midday weather delay of over an hour was incurred before half the field teed off.

Source:

Scorecard

Source:

References

External links

Coverage on European Tour's official site
Firestone Country Club site

WGC Invitational
WGC-Bridgestone Invitational
WGC-Bridgestone Invitational
WGC-Bridgestone Invitational
WGC-Bridgestone Invitational
WGC-Bridgestone Invitational